was a Japanese archaeologist. Aizawa, an amateur stone tool collector who had been peddling nattō, discovered a microlith in Iwajuku, Gunma in 1946, which was recognized in 1949 as a Paleolithic site that had previously been thought not to exist in Japan.

References
 Keiji Imamura. Prehistoric Japan: new perspectives on insular East Asia p. 19.

Paleolithic Japan
Japanese archaeologists
1926 births
1989 deaths
20th-century archaeologists